Dauset Trails Nature Center is a private, non-profit nature center located near Jackson, Georgia, United States. The nature center is open year-round, except for certain holidays.

Dauset Trails Nature Center’s stated mission is "to provide quality environmental education, outdoor recreation, and an 
understanding of early farm life through close and intimate contact with Georgia’s preserved flora and fauna."

Features

Trails
30 miles of mountain bike and hiking trails with beginner-, intermediate- and advanced-level paths. One of the trails leads to Indian Springs State Park. In 2021 an additional trail system called "The Creeks" was added connecting Dauset Trails with Jackson, GA.
5.5 mile loop Equestrian Trail 
Woodland Garden Trail
Tree Identification Trail

Animal Exhibits
An Animal Trail exhibiting more than a dozen animals from bobcats to otters that have been rescued or rehabilitated and cannot be released into the wild.
A 19th century-style farm exhibit with goats, pigs, cows, a mule, donkey and chickens.
The "Wonder Room" section of the Visitor's Center contains live reptiles native to Georgia.
 Home of the Official Georgia Groundhog General Beauregard Lee As of January 2018.

Images

References

Natural history museums in Georgia (U.S. state)
Museums in Butts County, Georgia
Nature centers in Georgia (U.S. state)
Protected areas of Butts County, Georgia